Out of Our Heads is a 1965 album by the Rolling Stones.

Out of Our Heads may also refer to:

 "Out of Our Heads" (Sam Smith song)
 "Out of Our Heads" (Sheryl Crow song)
 "Out of Our Heads" (Take That song)